Alahacı is a village in the Nizip District, Gaziantep Province, Turkey. The village is inhabited by Kurds of the Reşwan tribe and had a population of 1,428 in 2022.

References

Villages in Nizip District
Kurdish settlements in Gaziantep Province